The Guyenne spiny-rat (Proechimys guyannensis) or Cayenne spiny rat, is a spiny rat species found in Brazil, Colombia, French Guiana, Guyana, Suriname and Venezuela.

Phylogeny
Morphological characters and mitochondrial cytochrome b DNA sequences showed that P. guyannensis belongs to the so-called guyannensis group of Proechimys species, and shares closer phylogenetic affinities with the other member of this clade: P. roberti.

References

Proechimys
Mammals of Colombia
Mammals described in 1803
Taxa named by Étienne Geoffroy Saint-Hilaire